Acer sikkimense is a rare Asian species of maple. It is native to the Himalayas and nearby mountains in Sikkim, Bhutan, Nepal, northern India, Myanmar, Tibet, and Yunnan.

Acer sikkimense is a deciduous tree up to 20 meters tall with dark gray bark. Leaves are non-compound, up to 14 cm wide and 8 cm across, thin and papery, with no lobes, but sometimes with small teeth along the edges.

References

External links
line drawing for Flora of China drawings 3 + 4 at lower left

sikkimense
Plants described in 1867
Trees of the Indian subcontinent
Trees of Myanmar
Flora of Tibet
Trees of Vietnam
Flora of Yunnan
Taxa named by Friedrich Anton Wilhelm Miquel